Edward E. Simbalist (5 September 1943 – 12 March 2005) was a role-playing game designer.

Career
Edward E. Simbalist and Wilf K. Backhaus designed a role-playing game called Chevalier, which they brought to Gen Con IX in 1976 with hopes to sell it to TSR; after witnessing Gary Gygax berate a staff member, Simbalist decided not to approach Gygax about the game. At the convention, they met Scott Bizar of Fantasy Games Unlimited, who was interested in the game and helped to get it published over the next year as Chivalry & Sorcery, the first role-playing game from Fantasy Games Unlimited. In the late 1970s, Bizar contacted Simbalist and Phil McGregor to produce a science-fiction role-playing game, which was published in 1980 as Space Opera. Simbalist supervised both of his role-playing game lines until FGU reached a point where it was no longer able to release new products.

He was Canadian and lived in Edmonton. He also was a teacher at Edith Rodgers junior high school.

Books written or co-authored by Edward E. Simbalist
 Chevalier (1976), self-publisher
 Chivalry & Sorcery (1977), Fantasy Games Unlimited
 Bireme & Galley (Chivalry & Sorcery) (1978), Fantasy Games Unlimited
 Chivalry & Sorcery Sourcebook (1978), Fantasy Games Unlimited
 Destrier (Chivalry & Sorcery) (1978), Fantasy Games Unlimited
 Swords & Sorcerers (Chivalry & Sorcery) (1978), Fantasy Games Unlimited
 Arden (Chivalry & Sorcery) (1979), Fantasy Games Unlimited
 Saurians (Chivalry & Sorcery) (1979), Fantasy Games Unlimited
 Space Opera (1980), Fantasy Games Unlimited
 Chivalry & Sorcery Sourcebook 2 (1981), Fantasy Games Unlimited
 Ground & Air Equipment (Space Opera) (1981), Fantasy Games Unlimited
 Seldon's Compendium of Starcraft 1 (Space Opera) (1981), Fantasy Games Unlimited
 Star Sector, Atlas 1 (Space Opera) (1981), Fantasy Games Unlimited
 Star Sector, Atlas 2 (Space Opera) (1982), Fantasy Games Unlimited
 Chivalry & Sorcery 2nd edition (1983), Fantasy Games Unlimited
 Chivalry & Sorcery Sourcebook 1 & 2, 2nd Ed. (1983), Fantasy Games Unlimited
 Swords & Sorcerers, 2nd Ed. (Chivalry & Sorcery) (1983), Fantasy Games Unlimited
 Seldon's Compendium of Starcraft 2 (Space Opera) (1984), Fantasy Games Unlimited
 Star Sector, Atlas 3 (Space Opera) (1984), Fantasy Games Unlimited
 Star Sector, Atlas 5 (Space Opera) (1985), Fantasy Games Unlimited
 Seldon's Compendium of Starcraft 3 (Space Opera) (1988), Fantasy Games Unlimited
 Chivalry & Sorcery 3rd edition (1996), Highlander Designs
 Creatures Bestiary (Chivalry & Sorcery) (1997), Highlander Designs
 Game Master's Handbook (Chivalry & Sorcery) (1997), Highlander Designs
 Armourers' Companion (Chivalry & Sorcery) (1999), Britannia Game Designs Ltd
 Chivalry & Sorcery Light (1999), Britannia Game Designs Ltd
 Knights' Companion (Chivalry & Sorcery) (1999), Britannia Game Designs Ltd
 Chivalry & Sorcery: The Rebirth (4th edition - 2000), Britannia Game Designs Ltd
 Chivalry & Sorcery Red Book (2000), GameStuff Inc., free download pdf
 Game Master's Toolkit Volume 1  (Chivalry & Sorcery) (2002), Mystic Station Designs

The Great Cats Book Volume One (SkillSkape) (2003), Mystic Station Designs

The Creatures Book Volume One (SkillSkape) (2004), Mystic Station Designs

References

External links
An interview of Edward Simbalist.

1943 births
2005 deaths
Role-playing game designers
Canadian game designers